The Spokane Air Defense Sector (SPADS) is an inactive United States Air Force organization. Its last assignment was with the Air Defense Command 25th Air Division (25th AD) at Larson Air Force Base in Grant County, Washington

History

SAGE Air Defense Sector

SPADS was established in September 1958, assuming responsibility for air defense in Eastern Washington, North Idaho, and Western Montana. The organization eventually also provided command and control over several interceptor aircraft and radar squadrons.

On 8 September the new Semi Automatic Ground Environment (SAGE) Direction Center (DC-15) became operational.  DC-15 was equipped with dual AN/FSQ-7 Computers. The day-to-day operations of the command was to train and maintain tactical flying units flying jet interceptor aircraft (F-94 Starfire; F-102 Delta Dagger; F-106 Delta Dart) in a state of readiness with training missions and series of exercises with SAC and other units simulating interceptions of incoming enemy aircraft. However, until March 1960, SPADS did not have operational command over the radar and interceptor aircraft it directed. Instead, they were assigned to the 4700th Air Defense Wing until March 1960. The 4700th was transferred from direct assignment to 25th AD to SPADS briefly before being discontinued in July.

The Sector was inactivated on 1 September 1963 and its units were assigned to the 25th AD.

4700th Air Defense Wing
The Sector's only wing was designated and organized as 4700th Air Defense Wing at Geiger Field Washington to provide air defense of the northwestern United States on 1 September 1958. It was assigned two fighter groups flying fighter interceptor aircraft (F-102 Delta Dagger, F-104 Starfighter, and F-106 Delta Dart) and ten radar squadrons to accomplish its mission. When its 498th Fighter-Interceptor Squadron (part of the 84th Fighter Group) converted to F-106As, it became the first combat ready squadron flying Delta Darts. In May 1959, the wing's 4721st Air Defense Group at Larson was discontinued and its 538th Fighter-Interceptor Squadron transferred directly to the wing

On 15 March 1960, the wing's 636th, 637th, 822d and 823d Aircraft Control and Warning Squadrons and 538th Fighter-Interceptor Squadron were transferred to SPADS. Other radar units assigned to the wing, however, were transferred to other ADC organizations. The 634th Aircraft Control and Warning Squadron at Burns AFS, Oregon, in May 1960; the 638th Aircraft Control and Warning Squadron at Curlew AFS, Washington in December 1959, the 680th Aircraft Control and Warning Squadron at Yaak AFS, Montana in July 1960; the 716th Aircraft Control and Warning Squadron at Geiger Field, Washington in May 1959 and the 821st Aircraft Control and Warning Squadron at Baker AFS, Oregon in May 1960.

In May, the wing and its 84th Fighter Group were also transferred, leaving the wing without an operational mission, and it was discontinued on 30 June 1960.

Lineage
 Established as Spokane Air Defense Sector on 8 September 1958
 Inactivated on 1 September 1963

Assignments
 25th Air Division, 8 September 1958 – 1 September 1963

Stations
 Larson AFB, Washington, 8 September 1958 – 1 September 1963

Components

Wing
 4700th Air Defense Wing
 Geiger Field, Washington, 15 May 1960 – 1 July 1960

Group
 84th Fighter Group (Air Defense)
 Geiger Field, Washington, 1 July 1960 – 15 July 1963

Interceptor squadron
 538th Fighter-Interceptor Squadron
 Larson AFB, Washington, 15 May 1960 – 1 July 1960

Radar squadrons

 636th Radar Squadron
 Condon AFS, Oregon, 15 March 1960 – 1 June 1963
 637th Radar Squadron
 Othello AFS, Washington, 15 March 1960 – 1 June 1963
 760th Radar Squadron
 Colville AFS, Washington, 15 March 1960 – 1 June 1961
 822d Radar Squadron
 Cottonwood AFS, Idaho, 1 June 1963 – 25 June 1965
* 823d Radar Squadron
 Mica Peak AFS, Washington, 15 March 1960 – 1 June 1963
 825th Aircraft Control and Warning Squadron
 Kamloops AS, British Columbia, 15 March 1960 – 1 April 1962
 919th Aircraft Control and Warning Squadron
 Saskatoon Mountain AS, Alberta, 15 March 1960 – 1 April 1963

See also
 List of USAF Aerospace Defense Command General Surveillance Radar Stations
 Aerospace Defense Command Fighter Squadrons
 List of MAJCOM wings of the United States Air Force
 List of United States Air Force aircraft control and warning squadrons

References

Notes

Bibliography

 
 

Further Reading
 
 
 
 Radomes.org Spokane Air Defense Sector

Spok
1958 establishments in Washington (state)
Military units and formations in Washington (state)
1963 disestablishments in Washington (state)
Military units and formations established in 1958